The discography of Hej Matematik, a Danish pop band, consists of 2 studio albums, 2 extended plays, 18 singles, including 2 as featured artist and 4 promotional singles, and 17 music videos, including 2 as featured artist. Hej Matematik was first featured on singles by Danish band TV-2 before releasing their debut studio album Vi burde ses noget mere in 2008, preceded by the two single releases "Gymnastik" and "Centerpubben" in 2007. This success was followed with the sophomore release Alt går op i 6 in 2010.

Albums

Studio albums

Extended plays

Singles

Promotional singles

Featured singles

Music videos

Featured music videos

Notes
A The song of "Walkmand" was released as a part studio, part live version.
B "Maskinerne" was released as a remix version titled "Kato på Maskinerne" mixed by Kato.
C Hej Matematik provided backing vocals on the almost entire album "For dig ku' jeg gøre alting".
D "The loser sign" was exclusively released over the show "Natholdet".

References

Pop music group discographies